Miguel Ignacio Torres del Sel (born 3 July 1957) is an Argentinian politician and humorist, who has been National Deputy of Argentina representing Santa Fe province between 2013 and 2015. He belongs to Propuesta Republicana party. The president Mauricio Macri designated him Argentinian Ambassador to Panama between 2015 and 2017. He was also candidate to governor of Santa Fe in the 2011 and 2015 elections, but he was defeated by candidates of Socialist Party in both. 

He was born in Santa Fe and was very interested in sports and studied physical education. In 2017 he announced his retirement from politics to again be part of the group.

References

External links
 

1957 births
Living people
Members of the Argentine Chamber of Deputies elected in Santa Fe